Euschistus servus, the brown stink bug, is a species of stink bug in the family Pentatomidae. It is found in Central America and North America.

Subspecies
These two subspecies belong to the species Euschistus servus:
 Euschistus servus euschistoides (Vollenhoven, 1868) (brown stink bug)
 Euschistus servus servus (Say, 1832)

References

External links

 

Pentatomini
Hemiptera of Central America
Hemiptera of North America
Insects described in 1832
Taxa named by Thomas Say
Articles created by Qbugbot